Psilidius is a genus of beetles in the family Carabidae, containing the following species:

 Psilidius bredoi (Burgeon, 1935)
 Psilidius minutus Basilewsky, 1959

References

Scaritinae